Darwinella may refer to:
 Darwinella (sponge), a genus of sponges in the family Darwinellidae
 Darwinella, a genus of beetles in the family Promecheilidae, synonym of Pseudodarwinella
 Darwinella, a fossil genus of ostracods in the family Darwinulidae, synonym of Darwinula